The Critics' Circle is the national professional body of British critics for dance, drama, film, music, books and visual arts. It was established in 1913 as a successor to the Society of Dramatic Critics, which was formed in 1906 but had become inactive. The association is the equivalent of the American Theatre Critics Association, but older.

For many years the Circle gave no awards. In 1980 the members of the Film Section, known also as the London Film Critics' Circle, established the Critics' Circle Film Awards to acknowledge special achievements in the cinema. In 1989 the Drama section organized the first of its Critics' Circle Theatre Awards ceremonies, but it was not until 2002 that Dance awards were presented, followed from 2011 with annual awards by the Music and  the Visual Arts and Architecture sections.

In addition to these specific annual awards, since 1988 the Circle has presented the Critics' Circle Award for Distinguished Service to the Arts, voted for by all members of the Circle. The award takes the form of an engraved crystal rose bowl presented at a celebratory luncheon which, in recent years, has been held at the Royal National Theatre.

References

External links
Official website

1913 establishments in the United Kingdom
Critics associations
 
Professional associations based in the United Kingdom